Ganapathi Vignesh ( born 11 August 1981) is an Indian First Class cricketer.  He was part of Indian World Team in the Indian Cricket League Twenty20 competition. 
During 2008, Vignesh played half a season playing English club cricket for Birkenhead Park Cricket Club in the Cheshire County Cricket League.Known for his opening bowling and aggressive opening batting he has been selected by Chennai Super Kings for the IPL 2011 edition.

References

Kolkata Knight Riders cricketers
Tamil Nadu cricketers
1981 births
Living people
Indian cricketers
Goa cricketers
Chennai Super Kings cricketers
ICL India XI cricketers
Chennai Superstars cricketers